Laurie Sandilands (born 30 April 1949) is a former Australian rules footballer who played for Footscray in the Victorian Football League (VFL). 

He made his senior debut in 1966, after being recruited from a local Footscray District Football League club, the West Footscray Roosters. He played briefly in Footscray's Under 19's squad, before making his senior debut.

Sandilands was a key position forward and topped Footscray's goalkicking every season from 1972 to 1975. His best season tally was 50 goals which he kicked in 1974. Sandilands also captained the club that season and he remained in charge for a further two seasons. In 1978, he moved to Collingwood and played with the Magpies for one season.

External links

1949 births
Living people
Western Bulldogs players
Collingwood Football Club players
Australian rules footballers from Victoria (Australia)
West Footscray Football Club players
People from Seddon, Victoria